The Valley Railroad, operating under the name Essex Steam Train and Riverboat, is a heritage railroad based in Connecticut on tracks of the Connecticut Valley Railroad, which was founded in 1868. The company began operations in 1971 between Deep River and Essex, and has since reopened additional parts of the former Connecticut Valley Railroad line. It operates the Essex Steam Train and the Essex Clipper Dinner Train.

History

Construction
The vision of a Valley Railroad started in the 1840s when President of the Charter Oak Life Insurance Company, James Clark Walkley traced the 44-mile route by stagecoach with friend Horace Johnson. Walkley and a group of business men obtained a state charter on July 17, 1868, to form the Connecticut Valley Railroad Company and start the process of building a railroad.

During 1868–1869, survey crews worked to map out the line from Hartford, Connecticut, to Saybrook Point.

In April 1870, construction of the line began, with ground breaking taking place in Higganum, Connecticut. The plan called for three phases, the "Northern Division" starting in Hartford and continuing to Middletown, the "Middle Division" which continued to what is known today as Goodspeed Landing, and the "South Division" which finished the line to Saybrook Point. The Connecticut River Valley allowed for an easy construction, as no tunnels or major bridges were required. At $34,000 per mile, the line ended up costing $1,482,903.

Connecticut Valley Railroad
The first "regular" train started on July 31, 1871. On August 24, 1871, the Connecticut Valley Railroad declared an official opening. The schedules of trains operating along the Valley Railroad called for one mixed train and four passenger trains each way daily (except Sunday) with fifteen stops along the way.

The company grossed $34,000 in its first year.  It continued to grow, grossing $250,000/year in 1873.

Financial trouble plagued many early railroads, and the Connecticut Valley defaulted in 1876 on its second mortgage bonds and was placed in receivership.

Hartford & Connecticut Valley Railroad
On July 1, 1880, the Hartford and Connecticut Valley Railroad took control with president Samuel Babcock.

Passenger service ended in stages: between Saybrook Point and Fenwick in 1917, between Fenwick and Saybrook Junction in 1922, between Saybrook Junction and Middletown in 1929 or 1930, and Middletown and Hartford in 1933.

Valley Railroad Company (Present Day Company)
The Valley Line was abandoned on March of 1968, by the New York, New Haven and Hartford Railroad several months before merging into Penn Central. Penn Central had the Valley Line put up for abandonment. The Valley Line was saved by the Connecticut Valley Railroad Association (CVRA, later becoming Railroad Museum of New England) due to concerns of the abandoned branch line being torn up by the Penn Central. The Connecticut Valley Railroad Association, the Empire State Railway Museum, and private investors created today's for-profit Valley Railroad, obtaining a charter from the Connecticut State Legislature. The State of Connecticut took ownership of the line from the Penn Central, and designated the Valley line as a linear State Park. It reopened on July 29, 1971, with ESRM's 103 being the first locomotive to run on the current Valley Railroad with a train running between Essex and Deep River, 100 years to the day of the first train on the original line. 
The train was later expanded to Chester in the late 1970s and expanded as north as Haddam in later years.

Seasonally, trains connect with a steam riverboat at Deep River, which offers rides along the Connecticut River.

Rolling stock

Steam locomotives

Former

Diesel engines

Current diesel engines

Previous diesel engines

Passenger cars

Facilities

Track
The Valley Railroad Company leases, from the Connecticut Department of Energy and Environmental Protection, the track running from Old Saybrook up through Essex, Deep River, Chester, Haddam, and Middletown, totaling . The trackbed is gravel ballast, with track made of conventional wood crossties, with steel rails fastened to the ties. A major project funded by the company in 2015 put all mainline track from Essex (MP 4) to North Chester (MP 9.80) in stone ballast. The track connects with Amtrak's Northeast Corridor track near the Old Saybrook Station to the south. Presently, 14.25 miles of the line are restored for train service, with the remaining last seeing service in 1968. The rail corridor between Haddam and Middletown, which has been cleared of brush and receives property maintenance and surveillance from hi-rail vehicles, and is undergoing full restoration as time and funding permit.

The Valley Railroad Company has several grade crossings along its tracks. They vary in their nature, ranging from small caution signs at Private Crossings to flashing lights, bells, and gates and stop signs at public crossings. The busiest public grade crossings are located at Route 153 in Essex, Route 154 in Essex, and Route 82 (just before the East Haddam swing bridge) in Haddam.

Stations

The main station, where tickets are sold and all rolling stock is kept, is located in Essex; specifically, the village of Centerbrook. The main entrance and parking access is located off Route 154; there is a rear entrance (not for public use) on Route 153. There is a station building (used as offices for the riverboat operation) at Deep River Landing in Deep River, and a small station (used by the Railroad's track department) in Chester—it was originally the station at Quinnipiac, Connecticut. Goodspeed station, located off Route 82 in Haddam, houses an antique shop and is not affiliated with the railroad. Across the tracks from the station is the Goodspeed Yard Office. This building was the original Chester passenger station, located on Dock Road in Chester, but sold off and removed in 1874 when it was found that the railroad grade was too steep at that location for starting and stopping trains. Donated by the Zanardi family in 1993, it was retrieved by volunteers of the Friends of the Valley Railroad and moved by flatcar to its present location. It is believed that this structure is the sole remaining passenger station from the 1871 opening of the railroad.

On July 18, 2009, the Friends of the Valley Railroad built a passenger shelter in Chester on the site of the original Hadlyme station. The new building is a reproduction of the South Britain station, which was on the now abandoned Danbury Extension of the Hartford, Providence & Fishkill. The original station on this site served passengers of the town of Hadlyme, across the Connecticut River. Passengers use today's station to go to Gillette Castle State Park via the Chester-Hadlyme Ferry, the second-oldest continuously-operated ferry route in the United States.

In popular culture
The Valley Railroad makes an appearance in Indiana Jones and the Kingdom of the Crystal Skull with 2-8-0 97 appearing in some scenes of the film. It again appears several times in the Hallmark 2021 production 'Next Stop, Christmas.'

See also 
 Connecticut Valley Railroad Roundhouse and Turntable Site
 Deep River Freight Station
 Essex Freight Station
 List of Connecticut state parks
 List of heritage railroads in the United States

References

External links 

Heritage railroads in Connecticut
Transportation in Middlesex County, Connecticut
Tourist attractions in Middlesex County, Connecticut
Essex, Connecticut
Connecticut railroads
Parks in Middlesex County, Connecticut
Protected areas established in 1971
Railway companies established in 1971
State parks of Connecticut